The following is a list of Irish almshouses, also known as Gift Houses:

Leinster

Dublin - Clondalkin almshouses
Dublin - Stillorgan (Charles Sheils houses - now demolished)
Shee Alms House, Kilkenny
Switzer's Asylum, Kilkenny
Various Dublin almhouses
The Alleys, Drogheda, County Louth
St John's Home, Drogheda, County Louth
Netterville, Dowth, County Meath
Ormonde Almshouses, Barrack Street, Kilkenny

Munster

Skiddy's Almshouse, Cork
French Church, Waterford
Southwell Gift Houses, Kinsale
Denny Alms house, Tralee
Youghal Alms House, the 17th-century almshouses were constructed by Richard Boyle, 1st Earl of Cork in 1602 for widows. Each tenant received two shillings a week, enough to sustain her. Around the same time (1612), Sir Richard Boyle built a hospital and a free school. For his efforts in colonising Munster, Sir Richard Boyle was granted the title and dignity Lord Boyle in 1616. When a poll tax of two shillings was introduced in 1697, those living by alms were exempt. St Mary's Collegiate Church in the town still contains many monuments, including the tomb of Richard Boyle himself.
Limerick Almshouse
King's Square, Mitchelstown
Thurles Almshouse 
Villiers Almshouses, Limerick

Connacht
 Westport Almshouse, County Mayo

Ulster

 Seaforde Almshouses, Newcastle Road, Seaforde, Co Down 
Gills Almshouses, Carrickfergus, Charles Lanyon
Widow's Almshouses, Rockcorry, County Monaghan 
Blayney Almhouses, Castleblayney, County Monaghan

References

Further reading

External links

Almshouses
Almshouses